Women's basketball at the 2006 Asian Games was held in Doha from 4 December to 14 December 2006.

Squads

Results
All times are Arabia Standard Time (UTC+03:00)

Preliminary

Group X

Group Y

Classification 5th–6th

Final round

Semifinals

Bronze medal match

Gold medal match

Final standing

References

Results

External links
Official website

women